Pierre Pardoën (8 August 1930 – 17 June 2019) was a French professional racing cyclist. He rode in two editions of the Tour de France.

References

External links
 

1930 births
2019 deaths
French male cyclists
Sportspeople from Amiens
Cyclists from Hauts-de-France